Loxostege sticticalis is a species of moth of the family Crambidae. It was first described by Carl Linnaeus in 1761 and is found in the Palearctic and Nearctic realms.

The moth flies from May to September depending on the location.

The larvae feed on various herbaceous plants, such as mugwort (Artemisia vulgaris), beet, Chenopodium album and Artemisia campestris. It can become a pest for sugar beet and tobacco.

External links
 
 waarneming.nl 
 Loxostege sticticalis at UKmoths

Pyraustinae
Moths described in 1761
Moths of Europe
Palearctic Lepidoptera
Taxa named by Carl Linnaeus